Waskhaqucha (Quechua waskha (also waska) rope, qucha lake, hispanicized spelling Huascacocha) or Wask'aqucha (Quechua wask'a rectangle) is a lake in Peru located in the Junín Region, Tarma Province, Huasahuasi District. Waskhaqucha lies north of the Huasahuasi, near the village Huacuas, north east of it.

References 

Lakes of Peru
Lakes of Junín Region